In physics, an Analog Temperature Controlled Crystal Oscillator or Analogue Temperature Compensated Crystal Oscillator (ATCXO) uses analog sampling techniques to correct the temperature deficiencies of a crystal oscillator circuit, its package and its environment.

Typically the correction techniques involve the physical and electrical characterisation of the motional inductance and terminal capacitance of a crystal blank, the knowledge of which is used to create a correction polynomial, or algorithm, which in turn is implemented in circuit blocks. These are usually simulated in a mathematical modeling software tool such as SPICE, to verify that the original measured data can be corrected adequately. Once the system performance has been verified, these circuits are then implemented in a silicon die, usually in a bulk CMOS technology. Once fabricated, this die is then embedded into an oscillator module along with the crystal blank. Due to the sub  accuracy of this type of crystal oscillator specialist packaging must be used to ensure good ageing and temperature shock characteristics. Example applications are for use in low power or battery operated consumer electronic products such as GSM or CDMA mobile phones, or GPS satellite navigation systems.

References
Wireless Modules Score A Hit At Clay Pigeon Shoots  at www.mwrf.com/ (minor mention)
Low profile high stability digital TCXO: ultra low powerconsumption TCXO at ieeexplore.ieee.org (membership required)

Electronic oscillators